Robert Alan Barnes (born 26 November 1969) is an English former professional footballer who played as a full-back. He made appearances in the English Football League for Wrexham. He later went on to play in non-league for Northwich Victoria.

References

1969 births
Living people
English footballers
Association football defenders
Manchester City F.C. players
Wrexham A.F.C. players
Northwich Victoria F.C. players
English Football League players